That's What Dinosaurs Do is a children's book written by Jory John, illustrated by Pete Oswald, and published May 21, 2019 by HarperCollins. The story is "about unapologetically and happily being yourself, no matter the cost."

Reception 
That's What Dinosaurs Do received a positive review from Booklist  but mediocre reviews from Kirkus, Publishers Weekly, and School Library Journal.

References 

2019 children's books
HarperCollins books
American picture books